Chaetopteryx is a genus of insects belonging to the family Limnephilidae.

The genus was first described by Stephens in 1829.

The species of this genus are found in Europe.

Species:
 Chaetopteryx villosa (Fabricius, 1798)

References

Limnephilidae
Trichoptera genera
Insects of Europe